The Nobel Committee for Chemistry is the Nobel Committee responsible for proposing laureates for the Nobel Prize in Chemistry. The Nobel Committee for Chemistry is appointed by the Royal Swedish Academy of Sciences. It usually consists of Swedish professors of chemistry who are members of the Academy, although the Academy in principle could appoint anyone to the Committee.

The Committee is a working body without decision power, and the final decision to award the Nobel Prize for Chemistry is taken by the entire Royal Swedish Academy of Sciences, after having a first discussion in the Academy's Class for Chemistry.

Current members 
The current members of the Committee are:

 Johan Åqvist, Chairman
 Peter Brzezinski, also Secretary 
Claes Gustafsson
 Heiner Linke
 Olof Ramström
Peter Somfai
 Pernilla Wittung Stafshede (co-opted member)
Xiaodong Zou (co-opted member)

Secretary 
The secretary takes part in the Committee meetings, but can not cast a vote unless the secretary is also a member of the Committee. Until 1973 the Nobel Committees for Physics and Chemistry had a common secretary. 

 Arne Westgren (1926–1943)
 Arne Ölander (1943–1965)
 Arne Magnéli (1966–1986)
 Peder Kierkegaard (1987–1995)
 Astrid Gräslund (1996–, also member 2010–)
Gunnar von Heijne (2015–2020, also member 2001–2009 (chair 2007–2009))
Peter Brzezinski (2021-)

Former members 
 Oskar Widman, 1900–1928
 Per Teodor Cleve, 1900–1905
 Otto Pettersson, 1900–1912
 Johan Peter Klason, 1900–1925
 Henrik Gustaf Söderbaum, 1900–1933
 Olof Hammarsten, 1905–1926
 Åke Gerhard Ekstrand, 1913–1924
 The Svedberg, 1925–1964
 Wilhelm Palmær, 1926–1942
 Ludvig Ramberg, 1927–1940
 Hans von Euler-Chelpin, 1929–1946
 Bror Holmberg, 1934–1953
 Arne Westgren, 1942–1964 (chairman 1944-1964)
 Arne Fredga, 1944–1975 (chairman 1972-1975)
 Arne Tiselius, 1947–1971 (chairman 1965-1971)
 Karl Myrbäck, 1954–1975 
 Gunnar Hägg, 1965–1976 (chairman 1976)
 Arne Ölander, 1965–1974
 Einar Stenhagen, 1972–1973
 Bo G. Malmström, 1973–1988 (chairman 1977-1988)
 Göran Bergson, 1974–1984
 Børge Bak, 1974–?
 Stig Claesson, 1975–1983
 Bengt Lindberg, 1976–? 
 Lars Ernster, 1977–1988
 Sture Forsén, 1983–1995
 Ingvar Lindqvist, 1986–?  (associate 1985)
 Björn Roos, 1988–2000 (associate 1986-1987)
 Salo Gronowitz, 1988–1996 (associate 1986-1987, chairman 1991-1996)
 Bertil Andersson, 1989–1997
 Carl-Ivar Brändén, 1990–2000
 Lennart Eberson, 1995–? (associate -1994, chairman 1997-)
 Ingmar Grenthe, 1999–? (associate -1995)
 Torvard C. Laurent, 1996–1998 (associate 1992-1995)
 Bengt Nordén, 1995–2004 (chairman 2000-2003)
 Gunnar von Heijne, 2001-2009 (chairman 2007-2009)
 Håkan Wennerström, 2001-2009

References 

Nobel Prize in Chemistry
Royal Swedish Academy of Sciences
Awards juries and committees